was the sixth of ten s, and was built for the Imperial Japanese Navy under the "Circle One" Program (Maru Ichi Keikaku). This vessel should not be confused with the earlier Russo-Japanese War-period  torpedo boat destroyer with the same name.

History
Despite being one of the most powerful classes of destroyers in the world at the time of their completion, none survived the Pacific War.
Harusame, built at the Maizuru Naval Arsenal was laid down on 3 February 1935, launched on 21 September 1935 and commissioned on 26 August 1937.

Operational history
At the time of the attack on Pearl Harbor, Harusame was assigned to Destroyer Division 2 of Destroyer Squadron 4 of the IJN 2nd Fleet, and had sortied from Mako Guard District as part of the Philippine invasion force, covering landings at Vigan and Lingayen Gulf. From January 1942, Harusame participated in operations in the "Operation J". the invasion of the Netherlands East Indies, including the invasions of Tarakan Island, Balikpapan and eastern Java. During the Battle of the Java Sea, Harusame engaged a group of Allied destroyers. In March and April, Harusame was based at Subic Bay, from which she assisted in the invasion of Cebu and the blockade of Manila Bay in the Philippines. In May, she returned to Yokosuka Naval Arsenal for repairs.

During the Battle of Midway on 4–6 June, Harusame was part of the aborted Midway Occupation Force under Admiral Nobutake Kondō. The late July, she transferred to Mergui via Singapore to join the Indian Ocean raiding force, but the operation was cancelled due to developments at Guadalcanal, and she returned to Truk on 21 August.

During the Battle of the Eastern Solomons on 24 August, she was part of the escort for the battleship , and during most of September, she was an escort for the seaplane carrier , exploring the Solomon Islands and Santa Cruz Islands for potential base locations.

In October through mid-November, Harusame participated in nine "Tokyo Express" high speed transport runs or surface attack missions to Guadalcanal or Lae, as well as participating briefly in the Battle of Santa Cruz on 26 October under Admiral Takeo Kurita. During the First Naval Battle of Guadalcanal on the night of 12–13 November 1942, Harusame claimed heavy damage to an Allied cruiser by her gunfire. She returned to Yokosuka for repairs in early December.

In January 1943, Harusame returned to Truk escorting the troopship Asama Maru, and continued on to Wewak to resume transport operations to Kavieng. On 24 January, she was torpedoed by the submarine , and had to be beached to avoid sinking. She was recovered by salvage teams, returning to Truk for emergency repairs by the end of February, and returning on to Yokosuka by the end of May. At Yokosuka Naval Arsenal, one gun turret was removed and replaced by two additional triple Type 96 25 mm AT/AA Guns. She was reactivated at the end of November, and returned to Truk on 11 January 1944.

Through the middle of February, Harusame escorted tanker convoys from Tarakan and Balikpapan to Truk, suffering from minor damage in an air raid by United States Navy aircraft at Truk which killed two crewmen. She was reassigned to Palau on 19 February, and patrolled from Palau until the end of March. In April and May, she performed escort duties between Davao and Lingga and Tawitawi. Of her crew, 74 were killed, including squadron commander Captain Masashichi Shirahama. She was removed from the navy list on 10 August 1944.

Notes

References

External links

Shiratsuyu-class destroyers
World War II destroyers of Japan
Destroyers sunk by aircraft
World War II shipwrecks in the Pacific Ocean
Ships built by Maizuru Naval Arsenal
1935 ships
Maritime incidents in January 1943
Maritime incidents in June 1944
Ships sunk by US aircraft